Jonathan Mayezo (born May 22, 2000) is a French muay thai kickboxer. A professional competitor since 2017, he is the current SUPERKOMBAT World Super Lightweight Champion and WAKO-Pro Super Welterweight champion.

Martial arts career
Mayezo took part in the 2020 Empire Fight -72 kilogram tournament, held on February 8, 2020. He won the four-man tournament, after beating Khambakhadov Saifullah by decision in the semifinal and Jérémy Antonio by decision in the final. Two weeks after capturing the tournament title, at the February 22 Stars Night event, Mayezo beat Amansio Paraschiv by decision as well.

Mayezo faced Zhora Akopyan for the Empire Fight Kickboxing lightweight title at Empire Fight - Vikings Edition on October 2, 2021. He won the fight by majority decision.

Mayezo was scheduled to face Brown Pinas for the inaugural SUPERKOMBAT World Super Lightweight Championship at Superkombat Universe: Doumbé vs. Emiev on November 1, 2021. He won the fight by split decision.

Mayezo was booked to challenge the reigning WAKO Pro world Super Welterweight (-69 kg) champion Georgian Cimpeanu at UFN 9 on April 22, 2022. He captured the title by unanimous decision.

Mayezo faced Ahmed Bouchiber at Stars Night 2022 on May 21, 2022. He lost the fight by a first-round technical knockout.

Mayezo faced Edgard Rodriguez for the WAKO Pro World Low Kick Super Welterweight (-69 kg) championships at UFN 10 on January 20, 2023. He won the fight by a fourth-round technical knockout.

Mayezo faced Chris Wunn at Glory 83 on February 11, 2023, as a short notice replacement for Mohammed Jaraya. He lost the fight by unanimous decision.

Mayezo faced Marcio Jesus at Senshi 15 on February 28, 2023. He won the fight by unanimous decision.

Championships and accomplishments
Empire Fight
2020 Empire Fight -72 kg Tournament Winner
2021 Empire Fight -70 kg Championship
Superkombat Fighting Championship
2021 Superkombat Super Lightweight Championship
World Association of Kickboxing Organizations
2022 WAKO Pro World K-1 Super Welterweight (-69 kg) Championship
2023 WAKO Pro World Low Kick Super Welterweight (-69 kg) Championship

Fight record
 
|-  style="background:#cfc"
| 2023-02-18 || Win ||align=left| Marcio Jesus || Senshi 15 || Varna, Bulgaria || Decision (Split) || 3 || 3:00
|-
|-  style="background:#fbb"
| 2023-02-11 || Loss ||align=left| Chris Wunn || Glory 83 || Essen, Germany || Decision (Unanimous) || 3 || 3:00
|-
|-  style="background:#cfc"
| 2023-01-20 || Win ||align=left| Edgard Rodriguez || UFN 10 || Brest, France  || TKO || 4 || 
|-
! style=background:white colspan=9 |
|-  style="background:#fbb"
| 2022-05-21 || Loss ||align=left| Ahmed Bouchiber || Stars Night 2022 || Vitrolles, France || TKO (Referee stoppage) || 1 || 2:37
|-
|-  style="background:#cfc"
| 2022-04-22 || Win ||align=left| Georgian Cîmpeanu || UFN 9 || Brest, France  || Decision (Unanimous) || 5 || 3:00
|-
! style=background:white colspan=9 |
|-  style="background:#cfc"
| 2021-01-11||Win ||align=left| Brown Pinas || Superkombat Universe: Doumbé vs. Emiev || Dubai, UAE  || Decision (Split) || 5 || 3:00
|-
! style=background:white colspan=9 |
|-
|-  style="background:#cfc"
| 2021-10-02||Win ||align=left| Zhora Akopyan || Empire Fight - Viking Edition || Montbéliard, France || Decision (Majority) || 5 || 3:00
|-
! style=background:white colspan=9 |
|-
|-  style="background:#cfc"
| 2020-02-22 ||Win ||align=left| Amansio Paraschiv || Stars Night 2020 || Vitrolles, France || Decision (Split) || 3 || 3:00
|-
|-  style="background:#cfc"
| 2020-02-08 ||Win ||align=left| Jérémy Antonio || Empire Fight, Tournament Final || Montbéliard, France || Decision || 5 || 3:00
|-
! style=background:white colspan=9 |
|-  style="background:#cfc"
| 2020-02-08 ||Win ||align=left| Khambakhadov Saifullah || Empire Fight, Tournament Semifinal || Montbéliard, France || Decision || 5 || 3:00
|-
|-  style="background:#cfc"
| 2019-07-12 ||Win ||align=left| Ahmed Bouchiber || Ultimate Fight Night || Montélimar, France || Decision || 3 || 3:00
|-
|-  style="background:#cfc"
| 2019-11-16 ||Win ||align=left| Alexandru Constantinescu || NGC || Frenkendorf, Switzerland || KO || 3 || 
|-
|-  style="background:#cfc"
| 2019-10-19 ||Win ||align=left| Adam Ghaleb || Louna Boxing || Château-Arnoux-Saint-Auban, France || Decision || 3 || 3:00
|-
|-  style="background:#cfc"
| 2019-09-05 ||Win ||align=left| Chonlek Superpro Samui || Samui Stadium || Ko Samui, Thailand || KO || 4 || 
|-
|-  style="background:#cfc"
| 2019-08-28 ||Win ||align=left| Mahammad Hosein || Phetchbuncha Stadium || Ko Samui, Thailand || KO || 3 || 
|-
|-  style="background:#cfc"
| 2019-08-11 ||Win ||align=left| Yodrachan Jackie Muaythai || Samui Stadium || Ko Samui, Thailand || Decision || 5 || 3:00
|-
|-  style="background:#cfc"
| 2019-07-25 ||Win ||align=left| Teerapong Sitkorayuth || Samui Stadium || Ko Samui, Thailand || KO || 3 || 
|-
|-  style="background:#cfc"
| 2019-07-11 ||Win ||align=left| Avatan Kiat Udon || Samui Stadium || Ko Samui, Thailand || KO || 2 || 
|-
|-  style="background:#cfc"
| 2019-06-01||Win ||align=left| Filip Hucin || La Nuit Du KBP2 || Pernes-les-Fontaines, France || TKO || 3 || 
|-
|-  style="background:#fbb"
| 2019-04-27 || Loss ||align=left| Mohamed Souane || Partouche Kickboxing Tour || Pornic, France || Decision || 3 || 3:00
|-
|-  style="background:#cfc"
| 2019-04-06 || Win ||align=left| Nasir-uddine Lahouichi || Simply The Boxe 10 || Marseille, France || Decision || 3 || 3:00
|-
|-  style="background:#fbb"
| 2019-03-26|| Loss ||align=left| Simanoot Sor Sarinya || Khao Lak Boxing Stadium || Phang Nga province, Thailand || Decision || 5 || 3:00
|-
|-  style="background:#fbb"
| 2019-02-09|| Loss ||align=left| Vianney Seperoumal || La Nuit Des Champions || Saint-Joseph, Réunion, France || Decision || 5 || 3:00
|-
|-  style="background:#fbb"
| 2018-12-15|| Loss ||align=left| Faouzi Djellal || Les Princes Du Ring || Tours, France || Decision || 3 || 3:00
|-
|-  style="background:#fbb"
| 2018-09-22 || Loss ||align=left| Qendrim Bajrami || Gala Muay Thai || Geneva, Switzerland || Decision || 3 || 3:00
|-
|-  style="background:#cfc"
| 2018-08-25 || Win ||align=left| Suzumu Vwin || Phetchbuncha Stadium || Ko Samui, Thailand || Decision || 5 || 3:00
|-
|-  style="background:#fbb"
| 2018-08-10 || Loss ||align=left| Yodrachan Jackie Muaythai || Chaweng Stadium || Ko Samui, Thailand || Decision || 5 || 3:00
|-
|-  style="background:#fbb"
| 2018-07-18 || Loss ||align=left| Yodsanchai NayokATarsala || Best Of Samui || Ko Samui, Thailand || Decision || 5 || 3:00
|-
|-  style="background:#c5d2ea"
| 2018-06-09 || Draw ||align=left| Rachan Goldrank Boxing || International Charity Fight || Winterthur, Switzerland || Decision || 5 || 3:00
|-
|-  style="background:#cfc"
| 2018-04-28 || Win ||align=left| Csaba Kerek || NGC || Schlieren, Switzerland || TKO (Referee stoppage) || 3 || 
|-
|-  style="background:#cfc"
| 2018-03-10 || Win ||align=left| Massa Risti || Emil Frey Fight Night III || Martigny, Switzerland || Decision || 3 || 
|-
|-  style="background:#cfc"
| 2017-08-27 || Win ||align=left|  || Wanpinyo Big Fight || Ko Samui, Thailand || KO || 3 || 
|-
|-  style="background:#cfc"
| 2017-08-10 || Win ||align=left| Taphet Talingam Muaythai || Wanpinyo Big Fight || Ko Samui, Thailand || KO || 4 || 
|-
|-  style="background:#cfc"
| 2017-03-11 || Win ||align=left| Liridon Koxha || Emil Frey Fight Night I || Martigny, Switzerland || Decision || 3 || 3:00
|-
|-
| colspan=9 | Legend:

See also
 List of male kickboxers

References

2000 births
Living people
People from Villeurbanne
Sportspeople from Lyon Metropolis
French male kickboxers
French Muay Thai practitioners
Welterweight kickboxers
SUPERKOMBAT kickboxers